Ai-Petri is a peak in the Crimean Mountains. For administrative purposes it is in the Yalta municipality of Crimea. The name is of Greek origin, and translates as St. Peter.

Overview
Ai-Petri is one of the windiest places in Crimea.

The peak is located above the city of Alupka and the town of Koreiz.

There is a cable car that takes passengers from a station near Alupka to the main area in Ai-Petri.

Climate

Images

References

Crimean Mountains
Yalta Municipality
One-thousanders of Ukraine